Aasha Encounter is a 2022 Indian Telugu-language docudrama film based on the 2019 gang assault and subsequent killing of a young woman in Hyderabad.  It is written and directed by Anand Chandra. The film was released on 1 January 2022.

Plot
Disha gang assault and killing on 27 November 2019 shocked the entire country when 4 young guys in a Lorry targeted a Scooty driving young veterinary doctor and brutalized her crossing the upper limits in the crime history of India.

Cast
 Srikanth Iyengar as a NHRC Chief
 Sonia Akula as Aasha
 Sridhar Rao as Bharath

Production 
This film was initially announced to be jointly directed by Ram Gopal Varma and Anand Chandra under the title Aasha Encounter. However, the film had issues getting a CBFC certificate and Varma later disassociated himself from the film.

Release and reception 
The film was released on 1 January 2022. An NTV critic gave a mixed review for the film, appreciating the performances and score while criticizing screenplay and inconclusive climax.

References

External links 
 

2022 films
2020s Telugu-language films
Films about rape in India
Films set in Hyderabad, India
Indian docudrama films
2022 crime films